Dato' Dr Ismail bin Salleh is a Malaysian politician and served as Kedah State Executive Councillor.

Election results

Honours
  :
  Knight Companion of the Order of Loyalty to the Royal House of Kedah (DSDK) - Dato' (2013)

References 

Living people
People from Kedah
Malaysian people of Malay descent
Former Malaysian Islamic Party politicians
National Trust Party (Malaysia) politicians
21st-century Malaysian politicians
Members of the Kedah State Legislative Assembly
Kedah state executive councillors
1964 births